Reca or RECA can be:

 Reca, village and municipality in western Slovakia in Senec District in the Bratislava Region
 RecA, protein  essential for the repair and maintenance of DNA
 Radiation Exposure Compensation Act (RECA)
 Damian Reca, an Argentine chess master
 Arkadiusz Reca, Polish footballer

See also 
 Recaş (disambiguation)